The Battle of Simmon's Bluff was a minor and bloodless Union victory, fought June 21, 1862, in Meggett, South Carolina, during the American Civil War.

Union forces had laid siege to Charleston, which was being resupplied from a nearby railroad. Union forces were eager to capture the city, so they sent the 55th Pennsylvania Infantry regiment to sever the rail line. The 55th Pennsylvania departed by sea shortly before the battle in search of a place to land closer to the railroad. On June 21, the 55th Pennsylvania came ashore at Wadmalaw Sound. Union forces discovered an encampment of the 16th South Carolina Infantry regiment, and quickly razed the encampment and engaged the Confederate forces. The Confederates scattered after the encampment was razed and were unable to launch an effective counterattack. There were no reports of injuries on either side. After the raid, the Union forces returned to their ships and abandoned their original objective, which was to interrupt the rail line to Charleston.

Gallery

References

Sources
 CWSAC Report Update

Simmon's Bluff
Battles of the Lower Seaboard Theater and Gulf Approach of the American Civil War
Simmon's Bluff
Battles of the American Civil War in South Carolina
Charleston County, South Carolina
Battles and conflicts without fatalities
1862 in the American Civil War
1862 in South Carolina
June 1862 events